Cristián Marcelo Álvarez (born 28 September 1992) is an Argentine footballer who plays as a midfielder for Colombian club Deportivo Pasto.

Honours
Boca Juniors
 Copa Argentina (1): 2011–12

References

1992 births
Living people
Argentine footballers
Sportspeople from Buenos Aires Province
Association football midfielders
Boca Juniors footballers
All Boys footballers
C.D. Antofagasta footballers
Club Deportivo Palestino footballers
Cúcuta Deportivo footballers
Villa Dálmine footballers
América de Cali footballers
Deportivo Pasto footballers
Argentine Primera División players
Primera Nacional players
Chilean Primera División players
Categoría Primera A players
Categoría Primera B players
Argentine expatriate footballers
Expatriate footballers in Chile
Argentine expatriate sportspeople in Chile
Expatriate footballers in Colombia
Argentine expatriate sportspeople in Colombia